"Turn Blue" is a 1965 single by jazz organist Jimmy McGriff. The song was a tribute to Ghoulardi's catchphrase "turn blue!". Stereo Review noted that the track sounded similar to Ray Charles' "A Fool For You". The track was reissued on the Greatest Hits album in 1968.

References

1965 singles
1960s instrumentals
1965 songs